Dietrich Belitz (born 1955) is an American theoretical physicist on the faculty of the University of Oregon. He studies statistical mechanics and condensed matter  physics.

Early life and education 
Belitz earned his Diploma in 1980 and his Dr. rer. nat. degree in 1982, both from the Technical University of Munich (Germany). His dissertation was titled, Der Einfluß inkohärenter Tunnelprozesse auf die Leitfähigkeit ungeordneter Materialien (trans.: The influence of incoherent tunneling processes on the conductivity of disordered materials), advised by Wolfgang Götze. He did postdoctoral work at the University of Maryland, College Park.

Career 
In 1987 Belitz joined the faculty at the University of Oregon and is a member of the  Materials Science Institute there. Belitz became a Professor of Physics in 1997. His research has included statistical mechanics, condensed matter, and theory of quantum many-body systems."

Reviews of Modern Physics describes Belitz' interests as, "...focused on quantum many-body problems, including superconductivity, magnetism, transport processes, and quantum phase transitions."

Belitz is a member of the University's Condensed Matter Theory & Statistical Mechanics group, which describes their work as the study of:

Belitz served as Department Head of Physics from 1998–2004, Associate Dean for Natural Sciences from 2004–2010, and as  Director of the Institute of Theoretical Science at the University of Oregon from 2013–2019. 

From 2005 to 2020, Belitz served as associate editor for Condensed Matter Theory for Reviews of Modern Physics.

Selected publications

Awards, honors 

 American Physical Society Fellow, 2010. Citation: For work on classical and quantal phase transitions, and the nature of phases affected by generic scale invariance.

References

External links 
  (video, 1:31:56)

1955 births
21st-century American physicists
American academic administrators
Technical University of Munich alumni
Theoretical physicists
University of Oregon faculty
Fellows of the American Physical Society
University of Maryland, College Park people
Living people